Tilquhillie Castle is a castle near Banchory in Aberdeenshire, Scotland. A Category A listed building, the castle formally formed part of the lands of Arbroath Abbey. Historic Environment Scotland's listed-building report from 1972 described the castle thus:

The castle was subsequently restored with modern amenities.
The novelist and travel writer Norman Douglas spent part of his childhood in Tilquhillie, the home of his paternal ancestors.

References

Castles in Aberdeenshire
Category A listed buildings in Aberdeenshire
Listed castles in Scotland
Country houses in Aberdeenshire